Spodnje Vodale is a settlement east of Tržišče in the Municipality of Sevnica in east-central Slovenia. The municipality is now included in the Lower Sava Statistical Region. The area is part of the traditional region of Lower Carniola.

References

External links

Spodnje Vodale at Geopedia

Populated places in the Municipality of Sevnica